Symphorien Samba (born 16 April 1974) is a Congolese middle-distance runner. He competed in the men's 800 metres at the 1992 Summer Olympics.

References

1974 births
Living people
Athletes (track and field) at the 1992 Summer Olympics
Republic of the Congo male middle-distance runners
Olympic athletes of the Republic of the Congo
Place of birth missing (living people)